Werrington County is a suburb of Sydney, in the state of New South Wales, Australia. It is 50 kilometres (31 mi) west of the Sydney central business district, in the local government area of the City of Penrith and is part of the Greater Western Sydney region. The suburb is entirely residential with a high proportion of individual separate dwellings.

Werrington County is part of the Indigenous Australian, Darug nation and is located in the Deerubbin Local Aboriginal Land Council Area

History

Aboriginal culture
Prior to European settlement, what is now Werrington County was home to the Mulgoa people who spoke the Darug language, as part of the Darug Nation. They lived a hunter-gatherer lifestyle governed by traditional laws, which had their origins in the Dreamtime. Their homes were bark huts called 'gunyahs'. They hunted kangaroos and emus for meat, and gathered yams, berries and other native plants. Shortly after the arrival of the First Fleet in Australia in 1788, an outbreak of smallpox decimated the local indigenous communities and made it easier for settlers to dispossess them of their land.

Post European arrival
In 1806, Werrington County was established as part of a land grant to Mary King, the youngest daughter of Governor Philip Gidley King. Werrington County was then farm land until the early 1980s when land lots were sold for the residential and commercial buildings in the present day suburb.

Geography
Werrington County is geographically at a higher altitude than most other suburbs in the Penrith area. Werrington Creek runs on the eastern border of the suburb. Werrington Lakes lies on the southwestern corner of the suburb.

Commercial area

Werrington County is home to a Child Care centre, Werrington County Shopping Village, Caltex and 7- Eleven Petrol stations, The Henry Sports Club, Namatjira Neighbourhood Centre, Tennis, Golf, Squash and other sporting facilities. The suburb is also within a few minutes drive to St Marys Shopping Centre located in St Marys, New South Wales which hosts over 40 retailers including Woolworths and Target.

Demographics
As per the 2016 Census there were 3,645 residents in Werrington County with an average weekly household income of $1,605 compared to the national average of $1,234. 50.2% were males and 49.8% were females. The median age was 36 years. 81.2% of people were born in Australia. The top other countries of birth were England 4.1%, New Zealand 1.4%, Scotland 1.2%, Ireland 0.7% and Philippines 0.6%. 
The most common ancestries were Australian 32.3%, English 28.2%, Irish 8.4%, Scottish 6.1%, Aboriginal and/or Torres Strait Islander 4.7% and German 2.5%. The top responses for religious affiliation were Catholic 35.8%, Anglican 27.1%, No Religion 16.0%, Presbyterian and Reformed 3.2% and Uniting Church 2.7%. The majority of people (89.2%) only spoke English at home with the other languages spoken being Spanish 0.8%, Greek 0.6%, Arabic 0.6%, Hindi 0.5% and Italian 0.5%.

Schools

Werrington County Public School is located in John Batman Avenue. The primary school was established in 1982. The school was officially opened in 1993 and enjoys a fine reputation within the Penrith District. The nearest High School is Cambridge Park High School in Cambridge Park, New South Wales.

Parks and reserves

Werrington County has 5 parks covering nearly 29% of the total area which include Shaw Park, Ellison Reserve and Werrington Lakes Flora & Fauna Reserve.

Hospital
The nearest Hospital is Nepean Hospital in Penrith which provides multi-speciality Medical services. Werrington County also has a Medical centre at the Werrington County Shopping Village.

Transport
Werrington County has quick and easy access to Penrith by travelling west on Dunheved Road or along Great Western Highway. The suburb is serviced by the Great Western Highway and is also in close proximity to the M4 Western Motorway which can be accessed via Kent Road for residents travelling towards the Sydney CBD.

The nearest railway station is Werrington railway station on the T1 Western Line which provides direct train services to the Sydney CBD.

Busways provides 3 bus services around the Werrington County area. 
 Route 780 travels along Dunheved Road past the Werrington County Shopping Village before travelling to either Penrith or Mount Druitt via Ropes Crossing
 Route 782 travels around Greenbank Drive and Henry Lawson Avenue before travelling to either Penrith or St Marys.
 Route 785 travels via Cambridge Park to Werrington railway station covering parts of Werrington County.

Governance
At a local government level, Werrington County is part of the north ward of Penrith City Council, represented by Ross Fowler (Mayor of Penrith). At the state level, it is part of the Electoral district of Londonderry, represented by Labor Party member Prue Car. Federally, it is part of the Division of Lindsay, represented by Liberal Party Melissa McIntosh.

Werrington County is located in the Deerubbin Local Aboriginal Land Council Area.

Notes and references

Suburbs of Sydney
City of Penrith